Paul Douglas Waldorf (January 13, 1908 – January 30, 1980) was an American football and basketball coach. He served as the head football coach at McKendree College—now known as McKendree University—in Lebanon, Illinois from 1933 to 1935 and at Fort Hays State University in Hays, Kansas from 1936 to 1941. Waldorf compiled a career college football coaching  record of 40–32–9.
 Waldorf was also the head basketball coach at McKendree for two seasons, in 1933–34 and 1935–36, tallying a mark of 20–21.  He was a brother of the college football coaches Pappy Waldorf, John D. Waldorf, and Bob Waldorf, as well as the son of Methodist Episcopal Church bishop, Ernest Lynn Waldorf.

Head coaching record

College football

References

External links
 

1908 births
1980 deaths
Baker Wildcats football players
Fort Hays State Tigers football coaches
McKendree Bearcats athletic directors
McKendree Bearcats football coaches
McKendree Bearcats men's basketball coaches
Sportspeople from New York City